Phra Chanda Thawaro, commonly known as Ajahn Chanda, or Laung Pu Chanda Thawaro in Thai,, born as Chanda Chainit (February 10, 1922 – February 21, 2012), was a Thai Buddhist monk. Chanda is one of the best known Thai Buddhist monks of the late 20th and early 21st centuries. He was widely regarded as an Arahant — a living Buddhist saint. He was a disciple of the esteemed forest master Ajahn Mun Bhuridatta, and was himself considered a master in the Thai Forest Tradition.

Lore Of Luang Pu Chanda Thawaro
 Nomad of Dhamma

Notes

References

1922 births
2012 deaths
Thai Theravada Buddhist monks
Thai Forest Tradition monks
People from Roi Et province